Congressperson Bush or Congressman Bush or Congresswoman Bush may refer to:

U.S. Senator
 Prescott Bush (1895–1972), U.S. senator (1952–1962)

U.S. Representative
 Alvin Bush (1893–1959), served 1951–1959
 George H. W. Bush (1924–2018), served 1966–1970
 Cori Bush, serving since 2021

State representative
 Diane Mitsch Bush (born 1950), member of the Colorado House of Representatives (2013-2017) and candidate for US House of Representatives (2018, 2020)
 James Drew Bush III (born 1955), member of the Florida House of Representatives (2008-2010)

See also
 President Bush (disambiguation)
 Governor Bush (disambiguation)
 Bush (disambiguation)